Miloš Ristanović (Serbian Cyrillic: Милош Ристановић; born November 14, 1982) is a Serbian professional footballer.

References

External links
 Profile and stats at Srbijafudbal

1982 births
Living people
Sportspeople from Čačak
Serbian footballers
Serbian expatriate footballers
Bnei Yehuda Tel Aviv F.C. players
Expatriate footballers in Israel
FK Metalac Gornji Milanovac players
FK Mladost Lučani players
FK Sevojno players
FK Kolubara players
FK Jagodina players
Serbian SuperLiga players
Association football defenders